Marcus Anthony Myers-Harness (born 24 February 1996) is a footballer who plays as a right-winger for  club Ipswich Town.

He made his competitive first team debut for Burton Albion in September 2013, at the age of 17. He helped the club to win the League Two title in the 2014–15 season, and then had loan spells at Ilkeston and Aldershot Town, before he helped Burton to win promotion out of League One in 2015–16. He joined Port Vale on loan for the 2017–18 season. He signed for Portsmouth in July 2019 and played for the club on the losing side of the 2020 EFL Trophy final. He switched to fellow League One side Ipswich Town in July 2022.

Club career

Burton Albion
Harness spent time in the youth team at Coventry City, before switching to Burton Albion. He made his first competitive appearance for Burton in a 1–0 defeat to Notts County at Meadow Lane in a League Trophy tie on 3 September 2013. He made his league debut on 22 March 2014, coming on for Alex MacDonald 68 minutes into a 1–0 defeat to Scunthorpe United at Glanford Park. He made his first league start on 3 May, in a 1–0 defeat to Southend United at Roots Hall; this was his fourth and final appearance of the 2013–14 campaign.

He signed a two-year professional contract in May 2014. Speaking two months later, manager Gary Rowett said that Harness had "bulked up" over the summer and "he's one of those players who can go past people. Whether he can do that over a sustained period, we'll only know when he gets opportunities." On 27 August 2014, he was voted man of the match in Burton's 1–0 win over Premier League side Queens Park Rangers in a League Cup tie at the Pirelli Stadium; he won a free-kick on the edge of the box that was scored by Adam McGurk. He played 22 games throughout the 2014–15 season as Burton won promotion as champions of League Two. However he featured in just four games in the second half of the campaign, despite manager Jimmy Floyd Hasselbaink saying he was "doing really, really well in training".

On 7 August 2015, he joined Northern Premier League Premier Division side Ilkeston on a one-month loan. He was sent off during injury-time in a 4–3 win over Stourbridge on 23 August. Manager Gavin Strachan extended his loan spell at the "Robins" until the new year after he made a positive start to the season. However he was recalled by Burton so as to allow him a chance to play higher-level football, and caretaker-manager Andy Watson said that "we were delighted to have had Marcus here and his loan deal wasn't far from ending". On 27 November 2015, Harness joined National League club Aldershot Town on a five-week loan. However he made just two substitute appearances for Barry Smith's "Shots" during his spell at the Recreation Ground. He went on to make five substitute appearances for Burton as the club achieved promotion out of League One and he "impressed with his pace and direct running" during these games and was named as Burton's 'Most Improved Young Player' for the 2015–16 season, after which his contract was extended for a further year. He played ten Championship matches in the 2016–17 season, and Albion took up a one-year extension to Harness's contract in May 2017.

On 18 July 2017, he joined League Two side Port Vale on loan for the 2017–18 season. Manager Neil Aspin played Harness just behind striker Tom Pope, in an attacking midfield role that demanded a lot of hard work. He scored his first goal for the "Valiants" on 12 December, in a 3–2 defeat at Yeovil Town in the FA Cup, and said "it was good to finally get a goal, it has been a long time coming". He scored his first league goal 11 days later to secure a point away at Colchester United, leading Aspin to say "he can only go from strength to strength now he is starting to chip in with goals". He signed a new two-and-a-half year contract with the "Brewers" in January.

He scored his first goal for Burton in a 2–1 EFL Trophy defeat to Walsall on 4 September 2018. On 5 January, he scored a hat-trick in a 4–0 win at Rochdale. Having successfully broken into Nigel Clough's first-team during the 2018–19 season, he totaled six goals in 39 games.

Portsmouth
On 18 July 2019, Harness joined League One rivals Portsmouth on a three-year deal for an undisclosed fee. He scored his first goal for "Pompey" in a 2–1 defeat at Sunderland on 17 August. He scored a total of three goals in four games before being sidelined with a thigh strain picked up in a 1–1 draw at Blackpool a fortnight later. He disappointed manager Kenny Jackett with his performances upon returning to fitness. He was dropped in favour of Ronan Curtis and Ryan Williams, before regaining his first-team spot in December. He finished the 2019–20 season strongly, scoring none goals and providing seven assists in 37 games, often making a big impact from the bench; he earned himself praise from Jackett, who said "he has got a very, very good future ahead of him". Portsmouth qualified for the play-offs after finishing fourth, but lost on penalties following a 2–2 aggregate draw with Oxford United; he had scored Portsmouth's goal in the second leg, which would have been the winner if not for Oxford's equaliser.

Having scored a brace against Colchester United in the EFL Trophy, Harness went on to score a hat-trick playing as a number ten in a 4–2 win at former club Burton Albion on 3 October 2020. His third strike of the game, a "deft clip into the far bottom corner", would win him the League One Goal of the Month award; the goal was described by pundit Don Goodman as "nothing short of sublime". On 13 March 2021, he played in the 2020 EFL Trophy final, which had been postponed from the previous year due to the COVID-19 pandemic; he entered the game as a half-time substitute for Jordy Hiwula, which ended as a 0–0 draw, with Salford City winning the penalty shoot-out. He was a regular in the 2020–21 league season and was watched by Ireland manager Stephen Kenny. He achieved new manager Danny Cowley's target of ten goals for the season, however Portsmouth missed out on the play-offs after finishing in eighth-place.

Speaking in January 2022, Cowley said the club's priority would be to extend Harness' contract as he was the stand out performer in scoring ten goals from midfield in the first half of the season. Harness was though sent off for the first time in his career for fouling Ross Sykes in "a clear act of petulance" during a 4–0 win over Accrington Stanley at Fratton Park on 5 March. Portsmouth extended his contract as Cowley rated him as a Championship quality player. He scored 12 goals from 44 appearances in the 2021–22 season, though Portsmouth again fell short of the play-offs.

Ipswich Town
Harness signed for Ipswich Town on a three-year deal (with the club retaining a further 12-month option) on 15 July 2022 after Ipswich paid Portsmouth an undisclosed fee; striker Joe Pigott went the other way on a season-long loan as part of the deal. Town boss Kieran McKenna said that Harness was a good fit for the club and was entering his prime years.

International career
Harness declared his intention to represent the Republic of Ireland in July 2019.

Style of play
Burton Mail reporter Joshua Murray described Harness as a pacey and skillful winger, who is right-footed but able to play on either flank or even at wing-back.

Career statistics

Honours
Burton Albion
Football League Two: 2014–15
Football League One second-place promotion: 2015–16

Portsmouth
EFL Trophy runner-up: 2019–20

References

1996 births
Living people
Footballers from Coventry
English people of Irish descent
English footballers
Republic of Ireland association footballers
Association football wingers
Coventry City F.C. players
Burton Albion F.C. players
Ilkeston F.C. players
Aldershot Town F.C. players
Port Vale F.C. players
Portsmouth F.C. players
Ipswich Town F.C. players
Northern Premier League players
English Football League players
National League (English football) players